In the autonomic nervous system, fibers from the CNS to the ganglion are known as preganglionic fibers. All preganglionic fibers, whether they are in the sympathetic division or in the parasympathetic division, are  cholinergic (that is, these fibers use acetylcholine as their neurotransmitter) and they are myelinated.

Sympathetic preganglionic fibers tend to be shorter than parasympathetic preganglionic fibers because sympathetic ganglia are often closer to the spinal cord than are the parasympathetic ganglia.  Another major difference between the two ANS (autonomic nervous systems) is divergence.  Whereas in the parasympathetic division there is a divergence factor of roughly 1:4, in the sympathetic division there can be a divergence of up to 1:20.  This is due to the number of synapses formed by the preganglionic fibers with ganglionic neurons.

See also
 Postganglionic fibers
 Nerve fiber

References

External links
 Diagram at uwaterloo.ca

Autonomic nervous system